Ida Friederike Görres (2 December 1901, in Schloss Ronsperg, Bohemia – 15 May 1971, in Frankfurt am Main), born Elisabeth Friederike, Reichsgräfin von Coudenhove-Kalergi, was a Catholic writer. From the Coudenhove-Kalergi family, she was the daughter, one of seven children, of Count Heinrich von Coudenhove-Kalergi and his Japanese wife Mitsuko Aoyama.

Biography

Early life 
Ida Friederike Görres was born on December 2, 1901 in western Bohemia on her family’s estate in Ronsperg (today called Poběžovice), where she grew up. She was the sixth of seven children, and her siblings included Richard Nikolaus Graf von Coudenhove-Kalergi, Gerolf Joseph Benedikt Maria Valentin Franz Coudenhove-Kalergi, and Elisabeth Maria Anna Coudenhove-Kalergi. Görres grew up going to Austrian covenant schools, and in 1923 she entered a novitiate at the Mary Ward Institute in St. Pölten near Vienna.

Education and Work 
Görres went on to attend school at the College of the Sacred Heart in Pressbaum. She began an apprenticeship there around age 20 but left the convent in 1925. After that, she studied political science in Vienna from 1925 to 1927, and then other topics such as the social sciences, history, church history, theology and philosophy from 1927 to 1929 in Freiburg.

She became involved in the German Catholic Youth Movement in around 1925, acting as the federal leader of the girls and writing articles for the magazine Die Schildgenossen. Together with Walter Dirks and Ludwig Neundörfer, she headed the "Oktoberkreis" founded in 1930. Then in 1931, she went to Dresden as a youth secretary for girls' pastoral care and worked there at the Catholic Educational Institute. In the spring of 1934 she became diocesan secretary at the ordinariate of the Diocese of Meissen.

Around this time, Ida Görres met engineer Carl-Josef Görres (1903-1973), who was the older brother of Catholic psychologist Albert Görres and brother-in-law of Silvia Görres. On Easter day (21 April) 1935, Ida and Carl-Josef got married at the Oratory in Leipzig. Some time after the ceremony, the couple moved to Stuttgart-Degerloch. Through his work as an engineer and business consultant, Carl-Josef Görres made it possible for Ida to have the opportunity to work as a writer and theologian.  

Görres was active as a writer and wrote on various topics on hagiography, stressing the importance of the "humanness of saints." During the last three or four years of World War II, her books were not allowed to be sold in Germany. After the war was over, she continued to write, travel, and lecture, until in 1950 a breakdown in health drove her into seclusion. Her frank 1946 "Letter on the Church" unleashed significant controversy, though it is now viewed in hindsight as prescient. Her collection of personal writings, Broken Lights, Diaries and Letters 1951-1959, documents her work from this time.

She was loyal to the tradition of Catholic Christianity: "I have known no other father but these fathers, the priests of the Church, no brothers but my own dear brothers, the theology students," she said. "No mother but the Church...I loved them all and clung to them, not only as a daughter and sister, but as a Japanese daughter and sister, in the intensity of unconditional submission which belongs to Japanese filial piety."

Friendships 
Görres's friends included Werner Bergengruen, Maria Birgitta zu Münster, OSB, Erik von Kuehnelt-Leddihn, Walter Nigg, Alfons Rosenberg, and Gustav Siewerth. Also, Görres influenced and was friends with Church historian and Catholic intellectual Donald Nicholl.

Death 
Görres participated in the Würzburg synod and died a day after collapsing at a synod meeting in Frankfurt. At the Requiem held in Freiburg Cathedral, the eulogy was delivered by Fr. Joseph Ratzinger, who later became Pope Benedict XVI.

Works

Books translated into English 

 The Nature of Sanctity: A Dialogue (1932)
 The Burden of Belief (1934)
 The Cloister and the World (1935)
 Mary Ward (1939)
 The Hidden Face: A Study of St. Thérèse of Lisieux (1959)
 Broken Lights: Diaries and Letters, 1951-1959 (1964)
 Is Celibacy Outdated? (1965)

Quartet: The Christian Life 

Her first three books translated into English in the 1930s are part of a series of four books Görres published about key aspects of Catholic life and the Catholic faith. Part one is The Nature of Sanctity. Part two is The Burden of Belief on the Catholic faith in the modern world. The Nature of Sanctity and The Burden of Belief are both written in the form of a dialogue. Part three, The Cloister and the World, is about discerning one’s vocation in life; Görres wrote this one in the form of fictional letters to young women. The fourth book in this series, on the nature of mercy, has not yet been translated into English.

Essays translated into English 

 "Laywoman's View of Priestly Celibacy" (1966)
 “A Letter on the Church” (Dublin Review, 1949, translated by Ida Friederike Görres)
 "Of the Homelessness of God" (1949)
 “St. Joan” (1949) (initially published as “The Saint Who Took the World Seriously” in The Cloister and the World)
 "Trusting the Church: A Lecture"  (1970, translated by Jennifer S. Bryson) (also available as audio recording by Karina Majewski)
 "When Does a Person Have a Capacity for Liturgy?" (1966, translated by Jennifer S. Bryson)
 "The Wild Orchid and Christendom in the Novels of Sigrid Undset (1930)," (translated by Jennifer S. Bryson)
 "Women in Holy Orders?” (UK) / “Women As Priests? This Woman Says 'No.'” (USA) (1965)

Books in German (partial list) 

 Gespräch über die Heiligkeit (1931)
 Von Ehe und von Einsamkeit (1949)
 Der Geopferte: ein anderer Blick auf John Henry Newman, edited by Hanna-Barbara Gerl-Falkovitz (2011, published posthumously)
 Im Winter wächst das Brot (1970)
 Die leibhaftige Kirche (1950)
 Das Verborgene Antlitz: Eine Studie über Therese von Lisieux (1944)
 Was Ehe auf immer bindet (1971)
 “Wirklich die neue Phönixgestalt?” Über Kirche und Konzil; Unbekannte Briefe 1962-1971 von Ida Friederike Görres an Paulus Gordan, edited by Hanna-Barbara Gerl-Falkovitz (2015)

Legacy 
Görres is best known in the English speaking world for her 1944 study of Thérèse of Lisieux Das Verborgene Antlitz - translated as The Hidden Face. The British cookery writer and celebrity chef Delia Smith named the book as an influence on her Roman Catholicism.

References

External links

Website about Ida Friederike Görres

1901 births
1971 deaths
People from Poběžovice
Austrian women writers
Austrian people of German Bohemian descent
German Bohemian people
Austrian people of Japanese descent
Bohemian nobility
Austrian countesses
Ida
20th-century women writers
20th-century Austrian writers
Hagiographers